Stanislav Piętak (born 18 March 1946 in Smilovice) is a Czech theologian and pedagogue.

Pietak studied at the Evangelical Theological Faculty of the Comenius University in Bratislava and at the Christian Theological Academy in Warsaw. He received his doctorate from the Comenius University in 2000. He served as pastor in various congregations, e. g. in Třinec. He was chairperson for catechetics at the Pedagogical Faculty of the University of Ostrava (1993–2003)

He served as the bishop of the Silesian Evangelical Church of Augsburg Confession in 2006–2011.

He is one of the contributors of The Lutheran Study Bible.

External links
 Article The Gospel in Post-Marxist Societies by bishop Piętak
 An open letter from Stanislav Piętak, the bishop of the Silesian Evangelical Church of the Augsburg Confession, to the Southeastern Pennsylvania Synod of the Evangelical Lutheran Church in America (2009)

21st-century Lutheran bishops
Czech bishops
Lutheran bishops in Europe
Czech Lutheran clergy
Czech people of Polish descent
People from Cieszyn Silesia
People from Frýdek-Místek District
1946 births
Living people